Darra railway station is located on the Main line in Queensland, Australia. It serves the Brisbane suburb of Darra.

History
A stop at "nine miles forty four chain" from Central was established when the line between Ipswich and Brisbane was built in 1874. Service on the line were operating in 1875. No stops at the site were recorded in 1876 or 1877, probably because the stop was not staffed until the following year when passengers were first recorded at Darra station. The name Darra is most probably derived from a Scottish railway town as some of the engineers who were responsible for naming stops were Scottish.

A siding at Darra was constructed in 1885 to enable the loading of firewood for Hicks & Gray. In 1954, four platforms were built at the station but only three were used. On 17 November 1979, the Darra to Ipswich line was electrified.

Construction of the Springfield line
In 2010, the station was upgraded with two additional platforms and a new ticket office built as part of the quadruplication of the line from Corinda to accommodate services for the Springfield line which has a junction with the  Main line west of the station.

During construction a hand grenade was found by workers and then safely disposed of by army personnel.

The car park was expanded to include 60 new car park spaces and 40 extra cycle lockers.

Services
Darra is served by City network services operating from Nambour, Caboolture, Kippa-Ring and Bowen Hills to Springfield Central, Ipswich and Rosewood.

Services by platform

*Note: One weekday morning service (4:56am from Central) and selected afternoon peak services continue through to Rosewood.  At all other times, a change of train is required at Ipswich.

References

External links

Darra station Queensland Rail
Darra station Queensland's Railways on the Internet

Railway stations in Brisbane
Railway stations in Australia opened in 1874
Main Line railway, Queensland